Haifaa Jawad is an Iraqi Muslim scholar and Honorary Senior Lecturer of theology and religion at the University of Birmingham.

Biography
Haifaa Jawad received her BA and MA degrees from Baghdad University and her PhD from the University of Exeter. She has held academic positions at various institutions including Westhill College (1993-1999), New England College (American University) (1990-1993), Trinity College, Dublin and University of Alabama. Since 2001, she has been a member of the Department of Theology and Religion at the University of Birmingham.

Works

 The Rights of Women in Islam: An Authentic Approach (St. Martin's Press, 1998)
 Women, Islam, and Resistance in the Arab World (Lynne Rienner, 2013) with Maria Holt
 Muslim Women and Sport (Routledge, 2010) (ed) with Gertrude Pfister and Tansin Benn
 Towards Building a British Islam: New Muslims' Perspectives (Continuum, 2011)

See also
 Zailan Moris

References

External links
 Official Web Page at University of Birmingham

Living people
Year of birth missing (living people)
Place of birth missing (living people)
Women scholars of Islam
21st-century Muslim theologians
Academics of the University of Birmingham
University of Baghdad alumni
University of Exeter
Muslim scholars of Islamic studies